Wake Island is an atoll in the Pacific Ocean. It may also refer to:

Wake Island (film), starring Brian Donlevy
USS Wake Island (CVE-65), a World War II American aircraft carrier

See also
Battle of Wake Island, an early World War II battle for the island